In data visualization, an Andrews plot or Andrews curve is a way to visualize structure in high-dimensional data. It is basically a rolled-down, non-integer version of the Kent–Kiviat radar m chart, or a smoothed version of a parallel coordinate plot. It is named after the statistician David F. Andrews.

We can represent high-dimensional data with a number for each of their dimensions,  . To visualize them, the Andrews plot  defines a finite Fourier series:

 

This formula can be thought of as the projection of the data point onto the vector:

 

If there is structure in the data, it may be visible in the Andrews curves of the data.

These curves have been utilized in fields as different as biology, neurology, sociology and semiconductor manufacturing. Some of their uses include the quality control of products, the detection of period and outliers in time series, the visualization of learning in artificial neural networks, and correspondence analysis.

Theoretically, it is possible to project them onto an n-sphere. The projection onto the circle results in the aforementioned radar chart.

References
 
 
 

Data visualization
Statistical charts and diagrams
Applied mathematics